Microtritia is a genus of mites in the family Euphthiracaridae.

Species
 Microtritia contraria Niedbała, 1993
 Microtritia glabrata Niedbała, 1993
 Microtritia incisa Märkel, 1964
 Microtritia stria Liu & Zhang, 2014
 Microtritia tropica Märkel, 1964

References

Sarcoptiformes